Events from the year 1756 in Wales.

Incumbents
Lord Lieutenant of North Wales (Lord Lieutenant of Anglesey, Caernarvonshire, Flintshire, Merionethshire, Montgomeryshire) – George Cholmondeley, 3rd Earl of Cholmondeley 
Lord Lieutenant of Glamorgan – Other Windsor, 4th Earl of Plymouth
Lord Lieutenant of Brecknockshire and Lord Lieutenant of Monmouthshire – Thomas Morgan
Lord Lieutenant of Cardiganshire – Wilmot Vaughan, 3rd Viscount Lisburne
Lord Lieutenant of Carmarthenshire – George Rice
Lord Lieutenant of Denbighshire – Richard Myddelton
Lord Lieutenant of Pembrokeshire – Sir William Owen, 4th Baronet
Lord Lieutenant of Radnorshire – William Perry (until 13 January); Howell Gwynne (from 13 January)

Bishop of Bangor – Zachary Pearce (until 4 June); John Egerton (from 4 July)
Bishop of Llandaff – Richard Newcome
Bishop of St Asaph – Robert Hay Drummond
Bishop of St Davids – Anthony Ellys

Events
5 January - An article appears in The New York Mercury, criticising the work of Lewis Evans in identifying boundaries in his General Map of the Middle British Colonies in America.
Spring - Completion of Britain's longest single-span bridge (at this date), William Edwards' Old Bridge, Pontypridd, over the River Taff, at the third (or fourth) attempt.
Lewis Morris loses his post as collector of tolls at Aberdyfi.

Arts and literature

New books
Hugh Hughes - Cywydd Galarnadd am ynys Minorca...
Sion Kadwaladr - Einion a Gwenllian

Music
Elis Roberts - "Argulus"

Births
January - Richard Griffiths, industrial pioneer who opened up transport links into the Rhondda (died 1826)
7 June - Edward Davies ("Celtic" Davies), writer (died 1831)
23 June - Thomas Jones, mathematician (died 1807)
4 July - John Evans, surgeon and cartographer (died 1846)
18 November - Thomas Burgess, Bishop of St David's (died 1837)
date unknown 
Thomas Jones of Denbigh, minister and author (died 1820)
Simon Lloyd, Methodist preacher (died 1836)

Deaths
12 June - Lewis Evans, surveyor, 56?
5 August - Sir George Wynne, 1st Baronet, landowner and politician, 56
14 September - William Parry, antiquarian and fellow of Jesus College, Oxford, 69
23 September - John Talbot, judge and MP for Brecon, about 43/44  
28 October - Charles Somerset, 4th Duke of Beaufort, 47

References

1756 by country
1756 in Great Britain